Hesperadin is an aurora kinase inhibitor.

The small molecule inhibits chromosome alignment and segregation by limiting the function of mitotic kinases Aurora B and Aurora A. Hesperadin causes cells to enter anaphase much faster, sometimes before the chromosomes are properly bi-oriented.

Hesperadin, like other miotic inhibitors, limits and sometimes can stop the process of mitosis in cells. For this reason, some have considered hesperadin's potential as a cancer-preventing drug.

Hesperadin works as an inhibitor, attaching to the active sites of Aurora A and Aurora B kinases.

References

Protein kinase inhibitors
Sulfonamides
1-Piperidinyl compounds
Lactams